The 1942 NCAA Golf Championship was the fourth annual NCAA-sanctioned golf tournament to determine the individual and team national champions of men's collegiate golf in the United States. The tournament was held at the South Bend Country Club in South Bend, Indiana, hosted by the University of Notre Dame .

LSU and Stanford, the defending champions, finished tied in the standings and shared the team championship, the second for the Tigers and the third for the Indians. The individual title was won by Sandy Tatum, also from Stanford.

Team results

Note: Top 10 only
DC = Defending champions
H = Hosts

References

NCAA Men's Golf Championship
Golf in Indiana
NCAA Golf Championship
NCAA Golf Championship
NCAA Golf Championship